Gerolakkos is a village near Nicosia, the capital of Cyprus. It is immediately north of the Green Line. Nicosia International Airport (now defunct) is located about 2 km to its south-east. De facto, Gerolakkos is under the control of Northern Cyprus.

References

Communities in Nicosia District
Populated places in Lefkoşa District
Municipalities of Northern Cyprus